El Djouf is a desert, an arid natural region of sand dunes and rock salt which covers northeastern Mauritania and part of northwestern Mali. El Djouf is a part of the Sahara Desert in the north. El Djouf is 320 meters (1,050 feet) above sea level.

A meteorite of a rare type of carbonaceous chondrite was found in El Djouf in October 1989.

Geographic features
The El Djouf consists in a typical African type of broad shallow sedimentary basin, separated by divides formed by fault blocks, plateaus and mountain ranges, where rock waste eroded from higher surfaces has been deposited at the base.

Other significant basins of this type are those of Lake Chad and the Victoria - Kyoga lake basin, as well as the Congo and Zambezi rivers.

See also
 Geography of Mauritania
 Sahara Desert

References

External links
El Djouf 001 in the World Meteorite Catalogue Database

Sedimentary basins of Africa
Geology of Mali
Geology of Mauritania
Landforms of Mali
Landforms of Mauritania
Deserts of Africa
Ergs of Africa
Basins of Africa
Sahara